Diacheila is a genus of beetles in the family Carabidae, containing the following species:

 Diacheila arctica Gyllenhal, 1810
 Diacheila fausti Heyden, 1887
 Diacheila polita Faldermann, 1835

References

Elaphrinae